Nebria pulchrior is a species of ground beetle from Nebriinae subfamily that is endemic to Yunnan province of China.

References

pulchrior
Beetles described in 1906
Beetles of Asia
Endemic fauna of Yunnan